Major-General Mark Jeremy Strudwick  (19 April 1945 – 26 September 2021) was a British Army officer, who served as General Officer Commanding Scotland from 1997 to 2000.

Military career
Educated at St Edmund's School in Canterbury and the Royal Military Academy, Sandhurst, Strudwick was commissioned into the Royal Scots in 1966. He was twice mentioned in despatches for his service in Northern Ireland.

He was appointed Commanding Officer of 1st Bn the Royal Scots in 1984 and then became an instructor at the Staff College, Camberley, in 1987. In 1990, Strudwick was made a Commander of the Order of the British Empire, and later that same year was appointed Commander of 3rd Infantry Brigade. In 1992, Strudwick was appointed to the office of the Deputy Military Secretary at the Ministry of Defence.

He was made Director of Infantry in 1996 and then General Officer Commanding Scotland in 1997; in that role he was simultaneously Governor of Edinburgh Castle. He retired in 2000.

He was also Aide-de-Camp to the Queen.

From 2000 to 2012, he was Chief Executive of the Prince's Scottish Youth Business Trust. He was Chairman of Trustees of the Royal Scots Club Edinburgh.

Personal life
In 1970, Strudwick married Janet Elizabeth Coleridge Vivers; they went on to have one son and one daughter, all of whom survived him.

Strudwick died on 26 September 2021, at the age of 76.

References

 

1945 births
2021 deaths
Academics of the Staff College, Camberley
British Army major generals
Commanders of the Order of the British Empire
Royal Scots officers
People educated at St Edmund's School Canterbury
Graduates of the Royal Military Academy Sandhurst
British military personnel of The Troubles (Northern Ireland)